The Museum of the Armed Forces is located in Fortaleza de São Miguel de Luanda, in the Ingombota District of Luanda, Angola.

Founded in 1975, following the independence of Angola, the museum includes bi-motor airplanes, combat vehicles, and diverse arms and artifacts used during the Angolan War of Independence (1961–1974), the South African Border War (1966-1991), and the Angolan Civil War (1975–2002).

The museum also contains statuary which ornamented the avenues and plazas of colonial Luanda, which were removed after independence.  These include the statue of Diogo Cão, the first European to set foot in Angola, of Paulo Dias de Novais, founder of the city of São Paulo da Assunção de Luanda, of Vasco da Gama, and of famous Portuguese poet Luís de Camões, among others.

The museum grounds and outdoor exhibits, long in a delipidated state, underwent an extensive restoration project at some point between 1997 and 2013.

List of Exhibits

Vehicles
BRDM-2
BTR-152
Buffel
Eland-90
GAZ-66
Panhard AML-90
Renault 6
UAZ-469
Withings Recovery Vehicle (SAMIL-100)

Towed Artillery
15 cm sFH 18

Miscellanea
9K38 Igla
Ox-wagon
T-6 Texan
Wreckage of downed South African Air Force Puma and Mirage IIIRZ

External links
Museum of the Armed Forces, short English description angolamarket.com
Roteiros Turísticos
Museu das Forças Armadas

References

Municipalities in Luanda
Museums in Luanda
Museum of the Armed Forces (Angola)
Museum of the Armed Forces (Angola)
Military and war museums
Museums established in 1975
Angolan War of Independence
1975 establishments in Angola